The St. Prophet Ilija Macedonian Orthodox Church (Makedonska Pravoslavna Crkva „Sveti Prorok Ilija“) is a Macedonian Orthodox church serving the inner western Melbourne suburb of Footscray, Victoria, Australia. The church borders Footscray and is itself located on the outskirts of Seddon, a inner western Melburnian suburb. Built as a Methodist Church, it was transformed into a Macedonian Orthodox Church in the mid 1970s.

History
St. Ilija became the second church established by the Macedonian community in Melbourne. Plans were initiated from 1971 onward to form a Macedonian church based in Melbourne's inner-western suburbs. Located at Victoria street in the suburb of Seddon, a former Methodist Church was bought in 1974 and renamed St. Prophet Elijah. The church consecration took place on 26 December 1974. 

As a centre of community life, St. Ilija has influenced and shaped local Macedonian culture, education and society by upholding their identity and creating a sense of belonging to the area. Sunday mass is performed at the church. Attendance by parishioners averages some 200 per liturgy. Other religious services are held at Easter and Christmas that attract large numbers of Macedonians. In such instances, the local municipal council has blocked traffic access to part of Victoria street to assist with crowd management. The church also hosts christenings and weddings. 

St. Ilija has a Church Committee who administers its funds and other non-religious activities.  In the area of Walter street, Pilgrim street and Victoria street, St. Ilija used to own nearby residential properties. The Church Committee later sold them and one was turned into a language school teaching Macedonian. St. Ilija has a church hall. During the 1970s, film nights organised by St. Ilija church were held at the church hall and showed Macedonian movies to large audiences. In 1984, St. Ilija church bought a 40-acre property in Rocklyn to host large annual Macedonian community gatherings in the form of picnics in the Victorian countryside. Part of the Rocklyn property is also the site of the new St. Naum of Ohrid Monastery built in the early 2010s.

See also 

 Macedonian Australians

References

External links 
Facebook

Macedonian Orthodox churches in Melbourne
Macedonian-Australian culture
Buildings and structures in the City of Maribyrnong
1974 establishments in Australia
Churches completed in 1974